The Färichhorn is a mountain of the Pennine Alps, located between the Mattertal and the Saastal in the canton of Valais. It lies north of the Balfrin, at a height of 3,292 metres above sea level.

References

External links
 Färichhorn on Hikr

Mountains of the Alps
Alpine three-thousanders
Mountains of Switzerland
Mountains of Valais